Farrukh Hormizd or Farrokh Hormizd, also known as Hormizd V, was an Iranian prince, who was one of the leading figures in Sasanian Iran in the early 7th-century. He served as the military commander (spahbed) of northern Iran. He later came in conflict with the Iranian nobility, "dividing the resources of the country". He was later killed by Siyavakhsh in a palace plot on the orders of Azarmidokht after he proposed to her in an attempt to usurp the Sasanian throne. He had two children, Rostam Farrokhzad and Farrukhzad.

Background
Farrukh Hormizd was a member of the Ispahbudhan family, one of the seven Parthian clans. He was the son of Vinduyih, a descendant of Bawi, whose sister was the wife of Kavadh I and mother of Khosrau I. Farrukh's father and uncle, Vistahm, played an important role in defeating the Mihranid Bahram Chobin and restoring Khosrau II to the throne. Khosrau, however, had Vinduyih executed, which made Vistahm revolt against him. The rebellion of Vistahm lasted from 590/1–596 or 594/5–600, until he was betrayed by one of his own generals. After the death of Vistahm, Farrukh succeeded him as the spahbed of the north.

Career
During the late Byzantine–Sasanian War of 602–628, Farrukh Hormizd, and his son Rostam Farrokhzad, rebelled against Khosrau II, allowing the Byzantine emperor Heraclius to invade Atropatene, where he sacked several cities, including the Adur Gushnasp temple.

In 628, the feudal families of Iran secretly mutinied against Khosrau and joined Shahrbaraz. Kavadh was then released by the feudal families of the Sasanian Empire, which included: The House of Ispahbudhan represented by Farrukh Hormizd himself, and his two sons Rostam Farrokhzad, and Farrukhzad. Shahrbaraz, who represented the Mihran family. The Armenian faction represented by Varaztirots II Bagratuni and finally the Kanarang.

On 25 February, Sheroe, along with his commander Aspad Gushnasp, captured Ctesiphon and imprisoned Khosrow II. He then proclaimed himself as shah of the Sasanian Empire and assumed the dynastic name of Kavad II. He proceeded to have all his brothers and half-brothers executed, including the heir Mardanshah, who was Khosrow's favourite son. The murder of all his brothers, "all well-educated, valiant, and chivalrous men", strapped the Sasanian dynasty of a future competent ruler, and has been described as a "mad rampage" and "reckless". Three days later he ordered Mihr Hormozd to execute his father. However, after the regicide of his father, Kavad also proceeded to have Mihr Hormozd killed. With the agreement of the Iranian nobles, he then made peace with the victorious emperor Heraclius, which allowed the Byzantines to (re)gain all their lost territories, their captured soldiers, a war indemnity, along with the True Cross and other relics that were lost in Jerusalem in 614.

The fall of Khosrow II culminated in a civil war lasting four years, with the most powerful members of the nobility gaining full autonomy and starting to create their own government. The hostilities between the Persian (Parsig) and Parthian (Pahlav) noble-families were also resumed, which split up the wealth of the nation. A few months later, a devastating plague swept through the western Sasanian provinces, killing half of its population including Kavad II. He was succeeded by his eight-year-old son Ardashir III, who was killed two years later by the distinguished Iranian general Shahrbaraz, who was in turn murdered forty days later in a coup by Farrukh Hormizd, who helped Boran ascend the throne.

When Boran ascended the throne, she appointed Farrukh Hormizd as the chief minister (wuzurg framadar) of the empire. She then attempted to bring stability to Iran by the implementation of justice, reconstruction of the infrastructure, lowering of taxes, and minting coins. Her rule was accepted by the nobility and clergy, which is apparent by her coin mints in the provinces of Pars, Khuzestan, Media, and Abarshahr. No opposition was voiced towards her gender. However, after some time she was deposed in 630, and Shapur-i Shahrvaraz, the son of Shahrbaraz and a sister of Khosrow II, was made shah of Iran. However, he was not recognized by the Parsig faction of the powerful general Piruz Khosrow. Shapur-i Shahrvaraz was thus deposed in favor of Azarmidokht, the sister of Boran.

Usurpation and death 
Farrukh Hormizd, in order to strengthen his authority and create a modus vivendi between the Pahlav and Parsig, asked Azarmidokht (who was a Parsig nominee) to marry him. Azarmidokht, however, declined. After having his proposal declined, Farrukh Hormizd "no longer shied away from the throne itself", declaring "Today I am the leader of the people and the pillar of the country of Iran." He started minting coins in the same fashion as a monarch, notably in Istakhr in Pars and Nahavand in Media. In order to deal with Farrukh Hormizd, Azarmidokht supposedly allied herself with Mihranid dynast Siyavakhsh, who was the grandson of Bahram Chobin, the famous military commander (spahbed) and briefly shah of Iran. With Siyavakhsh's aid, Azarmidokht had Farrukh Hormizd killed.

Rostam Farrokhzad, who was at that time stationed in Khorasan, succeeded him as the leader of the Pahlav. In order to avenge his father, he left for Ctesiphon, "defeating every army of Azarmidokht that he met". He then defeated Siyavakhsh's forces at Ctesiphon and captured the city. Azarmidokht was shortly afterwards blinded and killed by Rostam, who restored Boran to the throne.

Family tree

References

Sources 
 
 

 
 
 
 
 
 
 
 
 
 

 
 

Year of birth unknown
631 deaths
7th-century Sasanian monarchs
Murdered Persian monarchs
House of Ispahbudhan
Spahbeds
Viziers of the Sasanian Empire
Generals of Khosrow II
Rebellions against the Sasanian Empire
7th-century murdered monarchs
People of the Byzantine–Sasanian War of 602–628
Generals of Boran